Philadelphia Gas Works (PGW) is the United States' largest municipally owned natural gas utility. Construction was completed by engineer Samuel V. Merrick on January 22, 1838, and operations continued from the 1800s to the present day.

History

Less than a year after the passage of "An Ordinance For the Construction and Management of The Philadelphia Gas Works" by the Select and Common Councils of Philadelphia on March 21, 1835, the Philadelphia Gas Works began providing gas service to the City of Philadelphia when the city's first 46 gas lights were turned on along Second Street, between Vine and South Streets on February 10, 1836. Construction of the Philadelphia Gas Works was subsequently completed by engineer Samuel V. Merrick on January 22, 1838. 

In 1841, PGW came under city ownership. Half a century later, the UGI Corporation (then United Gas Improvement Company) was contracted by the city in 1897 to operate and manage PGW. 

By the 1940s, PGW was serving some 500,000 customers in Philadelphia, providing 99% of the gas distributed within the city limits. At this time, the gas provided was primarily carbureted water gas.

Similar contracts to the one implemented with UGI in 1897 continued to be approved by city leaders until December 1972, at which time Mayor Frank Rizzo and the Philadelphia City Council contracted with the nonprofit Philadelphia Facilities Management Corporation (PFMC) to operate and manage PGW, beginning on January 1, 1973. 

The seven-member board of directors of the Philadelphia Facilities Management Corporation is appointed by the mayor. Its charge, as set forth in a management agreement between the City and the PFMC, makes the PFMC responsible for all operations of PGW through an executive management team, which includes a chief executive officer, chief operating officer, and chief financial officer. 

In 2021, Philadelphia Gas Works executives agreed to begin exploring ways to reduce the utility's carbon footprint in furtherance of city objectives to reach net zero carbon emissions by the year 2050 in an effort to help fight climate change.

In 2022, state utility regulators approved gas main replacement plans by the Philadelphia Gas Works to upgrade more than 1,000 miles of pipes that had been installed prior to World War II.

Awards
The American Public Gas Association has awarded PGW its 2010 Marketing and Sales Award. In 2009, PGW had an advertising campaign showing customers and the public about the value of natural gas.

Notes

References

External links

Buildings and structures in Philadelphia
Historic American Engineering Record in Philadelphia
Natural gas companies of the United States
Public utilities of the United States
1836 establishments in Pennsylvania